Phallodrilus macmasterae is a species of invertebrate in the Tubificidae family. It is endemic to Bermuda, where it was discovered in 1986. Three specimens were found in Prospero's Cave, a limestone cave near Castle Harbor in Hamilton Parish, Bermuda. The species was added to the IUCN Red List of critically endangered species in 1996, but due to the uncertainty of actual distribution of this species, it is now listed as data deficient.

References 

Tubificina
Endemic fauna of Bermuda
Animals described in 1986
Hamilton Parish
Taxonomy articles created by Polbot
Taxobox binomials not recognized by IUCN